Matthew T. Torra (born June 29, 1984) is an American former professional baseball pitcher. He played in the Chinese Professional Baseball League (CPBL) for the EDA Rhinos.

Career 
Torra attended Pittsfield High School and the University of Massachusetts Amherst, where he played college baseball for the UMass Minutemen. In 2004, he played collegiate summer baseball with the Orleans Cardinals of the Cape Cod Baseball League. 

Torra was drafted by the Arizona Diamondbacks in the first round (31st overall) of the 2005 Major League Baseball draft. The Diamondbacks sold Torra to the Rays for cash considerations in 2011. The Rays invited Torra to spring training in 2012. He was signed to a minor league contract by the Nationals on December 28, 2012.

References

External links

CPBL stats

1984 births
Living people
American expatriate baseball players in Taiwan
Baseball players from Massachusetts
Durham Bulls players
EDA Rhinos players
Mobile BayBears players
Orleans Firebirds players
Reno Aces players
South Bend Silver Hawks players
Sportspeople from Pittsfield, Massachusetts
Syracuse Chiefs players
Tucson Sidewinders players
UMass Minutemen baseball players
Visalia Oaks players
Yakima Bears players
2013 World Baseball Classic players